By-elections were held in Liechtenstein on 16 March 1930. By-elections were called following the resignation of the four Christian-Social People's Party members of the Landtag. The VP believed that general elections should be held in 1930 because the Landtag elected in 1928 is only continuing the term that started after the April 1926 general elections. The result was a victory for the ruling Progressive Citizens' Party, which won all four vacant seats in the Landtag. The VP did not participate in the by-elections. The result led to a debate over the introduction of proportional representation, which took place in 1939.

Results

By electoral district

References

Liechtenstein
1930 in Liechtenstein
Elections in Liechtenstein
March 1930 events
Election and referendum articles with incomplete results
By-elections